Hershey (officially known as Camilo Cienfuegos) is a Cuban village and consejo popular ("popular council", i.e. hamlet) of the municipality of Santa Cruz del Norte, in Mayabeque Province.

History
Milton Hershey, the famous American chocolatier and businessman, visited Cuba in 1916. Hershey decided to buy sugar plantations and mills in Cuba to supply the growing Pennsylvania-based Hershey Company. He built an adjoining town for the workers and their families to live, which he named Hershey. 

The village grew to 160 homes and had high standards of living a public school, medical clinic, stores, a movie theater and a golf course. There was also a baseball stadium where a team sponsored by The Hershey Company played home games. The factory was one of the most productive sugar refineries in Cuba and Latin America. The Hershey Company sold their holdings in Cuba in 1948. 

Hershey was renamed after the Cuban Revolution in honor of Camilo Cienfuegos. The sugar refinery was nationalized, wages were lower and the baseball stadium was demolished. The mill was closed in 2002 under the pretense that the factory had become inefficient. 

Residents still refer to the town as Hershey (pronounced as AIR-see) and Hershey signs still hang at the town’s train station.

Geography
Hershey, located between the cities of Havana and Matanzas, is 3 km from Santa Cruz del Norte and the Atlantic coast. Other nearby villages are La Sierra, Jibacoa, San Antonio del Río Blanco and Loma de Travieso.

The village has a station on the main line of the Hershey Electric Railway, with a branch to Jaruco, and is 5 km from the "Vía Blanca" highway, that connects Havana to Varadero.

See also
Arcos de Canasí
Bacunayagua
Boca de Jaruco

References

External links

Populated places in Mayabeque Province
Populated places established in 1916
Central Camilo Cienfuegos